Le Philippevillois was a French language weekly newspaper published from Philippeville (present-day Skikda), Algeria. It was founded in 1919, and served as the official organ of the municipality. As of 1937, Eugène Hubinger was the director of the newspaper.

References

French-language newspapers published in Algeria
Newspapers published in Algeria
Newspapers established in 1919